The Fanatics (also known as Fumbleheads) is a 1997 comedy film starring Ed Asner, Mark Curry, Barry Corbin and Austin Pendleton.

Plot
Quimby Falls, much like many American small towns, loves football with passion. When the Buzzard team owner moves the team to another town, a few die-hard fans formulate a drastic plan to bring the team back home again.

External links

Sports in Movies Review

1997 comedy films
1997 films
1990s English-language films